Tygart or Tygarts may refer to:

In Kentucky
Tygarts Creek
Upper Tygart Elementary, a school in Carter County

In West Virginia
Tygart Creek in Wood County
Tygart Junction, a ghost town in Barbour County
Tygart Lake in Taylor County
Tygart Lake State Park in Taylor County
Tygart Valley
Tygart Valley River (sometimes called Tygart River)
Tygarts Valley High School in Randolph County